The Arney River is a small river in County Fermanagh, Northern Ireland, feeding from Lower Lough MacNean and into Upper Lough Erne. It meanders through a wide, flat Glacial Trough between the uplands of Fermanagh, Belmore Mountain and the Cuilcagh Mountains. The valley is characterised by wide flat lowlands enclosed by low hills. The Cladagh River drains into the Arney River.

There are six bridging points on the Arney River, five of these are suitable for motorised vehicles, while one is located on private land near to the source of the river.

Angling
The river is often used by amateur anglers who are fishing for salmon and trout, however, the river is mainly populated by perch.

Name
There is a local tradition of an area beside the river called the Red Meadow alluding to blood soaking into the fields during the Battle of the Ford of the Biscuits. Alternatively the local brick making industry may also have given rise to this name as the river was lined with brick fields during the eighteenth and nineteenth centuries.

See also
 Rivers of Ireland
 List of rivers of Northern Ireland

References

External links
 Geograph - River Arney Photograph
 2014 BBC News story on new evidence regarding the Battle of the Ford of the Biscuits: "Bullet discovery set to rewrite history books"
  — "Maguire, MacBaron and Henry Duke’s crackers: the Battle of the Ford of the Biscuits", 7 August 1594

Rivers of County Fermanagh